Kyrylo Mieshkov is a male wrestler from Ukraine, who competes in the men's -92 kg freestyle division.

Career
Kyrylo represented Ukraine at the 2018 European Championships in Kaspiysk, Russia, and won bronze medal.

References

Living people
Ukrainian male sport wrestlers
Year of birth missing (living people)
21st-century Ukrainian people